Kharitonovskaya is a rural locality (a village) in Sibirskoye Rural Settlement, Verkhovazhsky District, Vologda Oblast, Russia. The population was 21 as of 2002.

Geography 
The distance to Verkhovazhye is 57 km, to Yeliseyevskya is 9 km. Sakulinskaya, Ostashevskaya, Safronovskaya, Voronikha are the nearest rural localities.

References 

Rural localities in Verkhovazhsky District